Charles Brill Bridges (7 March 1881 – 17 June 1955) was an Australian politician.

Early life 
He was born at Carcoar to leaseholder Henry Bridges. He was educated in Victoria and became a caterer.

Career 
He was a Paddington alderman from 1917 to 1922 and served on Sydney City Council from 1918 to 1921 and from 1922 to 1924. He was a Labor member of the New South Wales Legislative Council from 1925 to 1937 and from 1940 to 1943.

Family 
On 12 July 1900 he married Beatrice Camilla Leisner, with whom he had one son.

Death 
Bridges died at Wahroonga in 1955.

References

1881 births
1955 deaths
Australian Labor Party members of the Parliament of New South Wales
Members of the New South Wales Legislative Council
20th-century Australian politicians